This is a list of Maine suffragists, suffrage groups and others associated with the cause of women's suffrage in Maine.

Groups 

 Bangor Suffrage Center.
Belfast Suffrage League, formed in 1916.
College Equal Suffrage League of Maine, formed in 1913.
Congressional Union for Woman Suffrage, and later, National Woman's Party.
Cumberland County Convention of Reformed Men.
Equal Rights Association of Rockland, formed in 1868.
Farmington Equal Suffrage Association, formed in 1906.
Maine Federation of Women's Clubs (MFWC).
Maine Woman Suffrage Association (MWSA), formed in 1873.
The Men's Equal Suffrage League of Maine, formed in 1914.
Portland Equal Franchise League.
Women's Christian Temperance Union (WCTU), first Maine chapter formed in 1874.
Woman Suffrage Association of Portland.

Suffragists 

Sophia P. Anthoine (Portland).
Jane Sophia Appleton (Bangor).
Hannah Johnston Bailey (Winthrop).
Katherine Reed Balentine (Portland).
Camille Lessard Bissonnette (Lewiston).
Henry Blanchard (Portland).
Ralph O. Brewster.
Margaret W. Campbell (Hancock County).
Essie P. Carle (Belfast).
Sarah G. Crosby (Albion).
Lucy Hobart Day.
Lydia Neal Dennett (Portland).
Adelaide Emerson (Ellsworth).
Fannie J. Fernald (Old Orchard).
Jennie Fuller (Hartland).
Abby F. Fulton.
Obadiah Gardner (Augusta).
Ann F. Jarvis Greely (Ellsworth).
Isabel Greenwood (Farmington).
Ira G. Hersey (Houlton).
Charlotte Hill (Ellsworth).
Augusta M. Hunt (Portland).
Benjamin Kingsbury (Portland).
Deborah Knox Livingston (Bangor).
Clara Hapgood Nash.
John Neal (Portland).
Joshua Nye (Augusta).
Sarah Jane Lincoln O'Brion (Cornish).
Cordelia A. Quinby (Augusta).
Maud Wood Park (Cape Elizabeth).
Leonard A. Pierce (Portland).
Lucy Nicolar Poolaw (Penobscot) - (Indian Island).
Louise Johnson Pratt (Belfast).
 Olive Rose (Warren).
Leslie R. Rounds.
Lavinia Snow (Rockland).
Lucy Snow (Rockland).
Sophronia Snow (Hampden).
Jane H. Spofford (Hampden).
Lillian M. N. Stevens (Portland).
Zenas Thompson (Portland).
Rebecca Usher (Hollis).
L. Alfreda Brewster Wallace.
Florence Brooks Whitehouse (Augusta).
Robert Treat Whitehouse.
William Penn Whitehouse (Augusta).
Georgietta Julia Nickerson Whitten.
Elizabeth Upham Yates.

Politicians supporting women's suffrage in Maine 

 Carl E. Milliken.

Suffragists who campaigned in Maine 

 Susan B. Anthony.
Abby Scott Baker.
Henry B. Blackwell.
Carrie Chapman Catt.
Elizabeth Glendower Evans.
Beatrice Forbes-Robertson Hale.
Diana Hirschler.
Augusta Hughston.
Julia Ward Howe.
Florence Kelley.
Gail Laughlin.
Dora Lewis.
Mary Livermore.
Ettie Lois Simonds Lowell.
Nancy M. Schoonmaker.
Anna Howard Shaw.
Lucy Stone.
Maud Wood Park.
Mary Winsor.

Anti-suffragists 
Groups

 Maine Association Opposed to Suffrage for Women, formed in 1913.

People

 Harriet Bird (Yarmouth).
Sophia C. Brackett (Portland).
Susannah Bundy Brown (Portland).
Lucy Cobb (Rockland).
Margaret L. Dalton (Portland).
C. T. Ogden (Deering).
Sewall C. Strout (Portland).

References

See also 

 Timeline of women's suffrage in Maine
 Women's suffrage in Maine
 Women's suffrage in states of the United States
 Women's suffrage in the United States

Sources 

 

Maine suffrage

Maine suffragists
 
History of Maine
Suffragists